Citrobacter youngae is a Gram-negative species of bacteria.

References

Further reading

External links

LPSN
Type strain of Citrobacter youngae at BacDive -  the Bacterial Diversity Metadatabase

youngae
Bacteria described in 1993